Kaisei Kondo (近藤 魁成) is a Japanese kickboxer, fighting out of Osaka, Japan.

He was ranked the ninth best super featherweight kickboxer in the world by Combat Press between March and September 2022.

Biography

Early years
The son of a karate instructor, Kaisei is one of 8 siblings, from an early age he followed the path of his elder brothers Kensei and Taisei into karate and kickboxing training.
Around the age of 8, he developed the Legg–Calvé–Perthes disease making him unable to walk for a time. During his recovery, he watched the 2011 inaugural Krush Championship Tournamen which inspired him to pursue his dream and become a professional kickboxer.

After his recovery Kaisei started to actively participate in amateur competitions, by 2016 he had already amassed multiple Kansai regional titles and awards.

In March 2017 Kaisei won the All Japan Shin Karate K-2 Grand Prix this national title victory allowed to participate in the K-1 Koshien tournament later that year. Giving him a chance to confront himself with the best under 18-year-old amateur kickboxers of Japan.

Kaisei won the -65 kg K-1 Koshien tournament title on November 23, 2017 with a high kick knockout. This win installed him as one of the most promising young fighters of the country.

Professional career
Kaisei made his professional debut on March 21, 2018 at the K'festa 1 event. At just 16 years old Kaisei scored a first-round KO victory against Shota Hara.

Kaisei's next fight on June 17, 2018 against the more experienced Hayato Suzuki ended in a draw after 3 rounds. Following a disappointing result, Kaisei went back to amateur competition and won the 2018 K-1 Koshien tournament for a second time, making him the first to win this accolade two years in a row. He then rematched his opponent from the 2017 K-1 Koshien final Ruku as a professional in K'festa 2, Kaisei won by second-round knockout.

His impressive performances prompted the matchmakers to sign him for a Krush Welterweight title fight only 2 months later against the very popular champion Minoru Kimura at Krush 101. Kaisei went into this fight as a massive underdog but managed to knock down the champion with a high knee in round 1 before losing by body punches TKO in the following round.

On August 24, 2019 Kondo scored a first round, K-1 knockout of the year contender when he made Riki Matsuoka faceplant from a right overhand at K-1 World GP 2019: Japan vs World 5 vs 5 & Special Superfight in Osaka. Kaisei was then matched with top 10 ranked Jordann Pikeur for a shot at the 67.5 kg title on November 24 at K-1 World GP 2019 Yokohamatsuri. Kondo lost the fight by TKO in round 2 due to repeated knockdowns from punches.

On August 29, 2020 Kaisei entered the 4-man Krush -67.5 kg Championship Tournament at Krush 116. Kaisei won in the semi final by TKO from Punches against Kaito. He faced Kazuki Yamagiwa in the final and had to give up at the end of round 1 when he broke his hand and wrist hitting the top of his opponent's head.

Kondo was scheduled to fight Maki Dwansonpong at K-1: K’Festa 4 on March 21, 2021. He won the bout by majority decision with scores of 29-29, 30-28 and 30-28.

Konda faced Alan Soares at Krush 133 on January 28, 2022. He won the fight by a first-round knockout, flooring Soares with a knee to body.

Kondo faced Hayato Suzuki at K-1 World GP 2022 in Fukuoka on August 11, 2022. He lost the fight by a fourth-round knockout.

Titles and accomplishments

Amateur
 2018 K-1 Koshien -65 kg Champion
 
 2017 K-1 Koshien -65 kg Champion
 2017 Shin Karate All Japan K-2 Grand Prix Champion
 2016 K-1 All Japan A-Class Tournament -65 kg Champion
 2016 WBC Muay Thai All Japan Jr. League (U15) -65 kg Champion
 2016 K-1 All Japan Junior B-class -60 kg Champion
 2015 KAKUMEI Jr. -52 kg Champion
 2015 K-1 All Japan Junior B-class Tournament -60 kg Champion
 2015 Shin Karate All Japan K-3 Grand Prix Champion
 2014 Shin Karate All Japan K-4 Grand Prix Runner-up

Fight record

|-  style="text-align:center; background:#;"
| 2023-03-25 || ||align=left| Vitor Tofanelli || Krush 147 || Tokyo, Japan || ||
|-  style="background:#fbb"
| 2022-08-11|| Loss ||align=left| Hayato Suzuki ||  K-1 World GP 2022 in Fukuoka || Fukuoka, Japan || Ext.R KO (Left straight) || 4 || 1:09
|-  style="text-align:center; background:#cfc"
| 2022-01-28 || Win || align=left| Alan Soares || Krush 133 || Tokyo, Japan || KO (knees to the body) || 1 || 0:40
|-  style="text-align:center; background:#cfc;"
| 2021-03-21|| Win|| align=left| Duangsompong MakiGym || K-1: K'Festa 4 Day 1 || Tokyo, Japan || Decision (majority)||3 ||3:00
|-  style="text-align:center; background:#fbb;"
| 2020-08-29 || Loss || align=left| Kazuki Yamagiwa|| Krush.116, -67.5 kg Championship Tournament Final  || Tokyo, Japan || TKO (retirement/wrist injury) || 1 || 3:00  
|-
! style=background:white colspan=9 |
|-  style="text-align:center; background:#cfc;"
| 2020-08-29 || Win || align=left| Kaito|| Krush.116, -67.5 kg Championship Tournament Semi Final  || Tokyo, Japan || KO (punches) || 2 || 2:54 
|-
|-  style="text-align:center; background:#cfc;"
| 2020-03-28|| Win ||align=left| Kazuki Yamagiwa || Krush.112 || Tokyo, Japan || Decision (unanimous) || 3 || 3:00
|-  style="text-align:center; background:#FFBBBB;"
| 2019-11-24 || Loss|| align=left| Jordann Pikeur|| K-1 World GP 2019 Yokohamatsuri  || Yokohama, Japan || TKO (3 Knockdowns/Punches)|| 2 || 2:40 
|-
|- style="text-align:center; background:#cfc;"
| 2019-08-24|| Win ||align=left| Riki Matsuoka || K-1 World GP 2019: Japan vs World 5 vs 5 & Special Superfight in Osaka || Osaka, Japan || KO (right cross) || 1 || 2:18
|-  style="text-align:center; background:#FFBBBB;"7
| 2019-05-10|| Loss ||align=left| Minoru Kimura || Krush.101 || Tokyo, Japan || KO (body punches) || 2 || 1:43
|-
! style=background:white colspan=9 |
|-  style="text-align:center; background:#CCFFCC;"
| 2019-03-10|| Win ||align=left| Ruku || K-1 World GP 2019: K’FESTA 2 || Saitama, Japan || KO (punches) || 2 || 2:23
|-  style="text-align:center; background:#c5d2ea;"
| 2018-06-17|| Draw ||align=left| Hayato Suzuki || K-1 World GP 2018: 2nd Featherweight Championship Tournament || Saitama, Japan || Decision || 3 || 3:00
|-  style="text-align:center; background:#CCFFCC;"
| 2018-03-21|| Win ||align=left| Shota Hara || K-1 World GP 2018: K'FESTA.1 || Saitama, Japan || KO (punches)|| 1 || 1:23
|-
| colspan=9 | Legend:    

|-
|- style="background:#cfc;"
| 2018-09-24|| Win ||align=left| Ryuka Oba || K-1 World GP 2018: inaugural Cruiserweight Championship Tournament || Saitama, Japan || Decision (Unanimous) || 3 || 2:00
|-
! style=background:white colspan=9 |
|- style="background:#cfc;"
| 2018-07-29|| Win ||align=left| Jail Tase || K-1 Koshien 2018 Tournament Semi Final || Tokyo, Japan || TKO (Punches) || 1 || 1:05
|- style="background:#cfc;"
| 2018-07-29|| Win ||align=left| Kaito Hirokoshi || K-1 Koshien 2018 Tournament Quarter Final || Tokyo, Japan || KO (Right Cross) || 1 || 0:15
|- style="background:#cfc;"
| 2017-11-23|| Win ||align=left| Ruku Kojima|| K-1 World GP 2017, K-1 Koshien 2017 Tournament Final || Tokyo, Japan || KO (Left High Kick) || 3 || 0:15
|-
! style=background:white colspan=9 |
|- style="background:#cfc;"
| 2017-07-29|| Win ||align=left| Ryuki Noguchi || K-1 Koshien 2017 Tournament, Semi FInal || Tokyo, Japan || KO (Punches) || 1 ||
|-  style="background:#CCFFCC;"
| 2016-12-11|| Win||align=left| Fumiya Kato || 3rd K-1 All Japan Amateur Challenge, A-Class Tournament -65 kg Final || Tokyo, Japan || Decision (Unanimous) || 1 ||2:00 
|-
! style=background:white colspan=9 |
|-  style="background:#CCFFCC;"
| 2016-12-11|| Win||align=left| Yuki Takeuchi || 3rd K-1 All Japan Amateur Challenge, A-Class Tournament -65 kg Semi Final || Tokyo, Japan || KO || 1 ||
|-  style="background:#CCFFCC;"
| 2016-12-11|| Win||align=left| Kazuki Matsumoto || 3rd K-1 All Japan Amateur Challenge, A-Class Tournament -65 kg Quarter Final || Tokyo, Japan || KO || 1 ||
|-  style="background:#FFBBBB;"
| 2016-11-20|| Loss ||align=left| Naoki Inoue || J-Network All Japan A-League Tournament, Semi Final|| Tokyo, Japan || Decision ||   ||
|-  style="background:#CCFFCC;"
| 2016-11-20|| Win ||align=left| Yuki Yasukawa || J-Network All Japan A-League Tournament, Quarter Final|| Tokyo, Japan || KO ||   || 1:27
|-  style="background:#CCFFCC;"
| 2016-11-20|| Win ||align=left| Hiroki Suzuki || J-Network All Japan A-League Tournament, First Round || Tokyo, Japan || Decision (Unanimous)|| 2  || 2:00
|- style="background:#cfc;"
| 2016-10-09|| Win ||align=left| Katsumi Sano || NJKF West Japan Young Fight 2nd || Osaka, Japan || Decision (Unanimous) || 2 || 1:30
|-
! style=background:white colspan=9 |
|- style="background:#cfc;"
| 2016-08-20|| Win ||align=left| Naruse Hayashi || K-1 Amateur in Nagoya || Nagoya, Japan || KO  || 1 ||
|-  style="background:#CCFFCC;"
| 2016-07-03|| Win ||align=left| Katsumi Sano|| Next Level 31 || Osaka, Japan || Decision (Unanimous) || 2  || 1:30
|-  style="background:#FFBBBB;"
| 2016-05-29|| Loss ||align=left| Yuki Yamazaki|| Next Level 30 || Osaka, Japan || Decision (Unanimous) || 2  || 2:00
|-  style="background:#CCFFCC;"
| 2016-05-22|| Win||align=left| Yuga Furuta|| K-1 All Japan Amateur Challenge 2016, B-Class Final || Tokyo, Japan || Decision (Unanimos) || 2 || 2:00
|-
! style=background:white colspan=9 |
|-  style="background:#CCFFCC;"
| 2016-04-29|| Win ||align=left| Ryuichi Kamojima|| Next Level 29 || Osaka, Japan || Decision || 2  || 2:00
|-  style="background:#CCFFCC;"
| 2016-02-14|| Win ||align=left| Shiryu Tanaka|| K-1 Amateur All Japan B-Class || Osaka, Japan || Decision || 2  || 2:00
|-  style="background:#CCFFCC;"
| 2015-12-27|| Win ||align=left| Kouta Shintani || Next Level Kansai 26 || Osaka, Japan || Decision || 3  ||
|-  style="background:#CCFFCC;"
| 2015-08-15|| Win||align=left| Yuma Saikyo|| K-1 All Japan Amateur Challenge 2015, B-Class Tournament Final || Tokyo, Japan || Extra Round Decision || 2 || 2:00
|-
! style=background:white colspan=9 |
|-  style="background:#CCFFCC;"
| 2015-08-15|| Win||align=left| Kuramoto || K-1 All Japan Amateur Challenge 2015, B-Class Tournament Semi Final || Tokyo, Japan || Forfeit ||  ||
|-  style="background:#CCFFCC;"
| 2015-06-14|| Win ||align=left| Koudai Niiya || NEXT LEVEL Kansai 23 || Osaka, Japan || Decision || 3 || 2:00
|-  style="background:#fbb;"
| 2015-04-26|| Loss||align=left| Yuma Saikyo || K-1 Amateur Challenge 2015, All Japan B-class Tournament Final || Japan || Decision || 1 || 2:00
|-  style="background:#CCFFCC;"
| 2014-09-21|| Win ||align=left| Katsuya Aoki || TK BORDER -Season 6- The 3rd || Osaka, Japan || Decision (Unanimous) || 3 || 2:00
|-
! style=background:white colspan=9 |
|-  style="background:#CCFFCC;"
| 2014-06-22|| Win ||align=left| Riku Hashimoto || Hoost Cup Spirit 4 || Osaka, Japan || Decision ||  || 1:30
|-  style="background:#CCFFCC;"
| 2014-06-15|| Win ||align=left| Genta Matsubayashi || KAKUMEI KICKBOXING || Osaka, Japan || KO || 2 || 0:26
|-  style="background:#CCFFCC;"
| 2013-11-23|| Win ||align=left| Itsuki Kobori || KAKUMEI KICKBOXING || Osaka, Japan || Decision (Unanimous)|| 3 || 1:30
|-  style="background:#CCFFCC;"
| 2013-11-23|| Win ||align=left| Katsuya Aoki || KAKUMEI KICKBOXING || Osaka, Japan || Decision (Split)|| 3 || 1:30
|-  style="background:#CCFFCC;"
| 2013-06-16|| Win ||align=left| Katsuya Aoki || KAKUMEI KICKBOXING || Osaka, Japan || Decision (Split)|| 3 || 1:30
|-  style="background:#FFBBBB;"
| 2013-03-03|| Loss ||align=left| Yoshiho Tane || KAKUMEI Kickboxing|| Osaka, Japan || Decision (Unanimous)|| 3 || 1:30

|-
| colspan=9 | Legend:

References

Living people
2001 births
Japanese male kickboxers